Fritz Heinsheimer (6 May 1897 – 8 August 1958) was a German painter. His work was part of the art competitions at the 1928 Summer Olympics and the 1932 Summer Olympics.

References

1897 births
1958 deaths
20th-century German painters
20th-century German male artists
German male painters
Olympic competitors in art competitions
People from Neckar-Odenwald-Kreis